JSK may refer to:
Jai Shree Krishna (in his form as Lord Purushottama).
 JS Kabylie, an Algerian football club
 JS Kairouan, a Tunisian football club
 Jansankhya Sthirata Kosh, an Indian population concern organization
 Janette Sadik-Khan, former Commissioner of the New York City Department of Transportation
 Jumper skirt
Joburg Super Kings, Cricket team in South africa premier league